Walter Winston (by 1502 – 1540 or later), of Randwick, Gloucestershire, was an English politician.

Family
Winston was of the gentry. He was related to other MPs: David Broke, Sir John Brydges and Richard Tracy. He married Margaret Baynham.

Career
He was a Member (MP) of the Parliament of England for Wootton Bassett in 1529.

References

16th-century deaths
English MPs 1529–1536
People from Stroud District
Year of birth uncertain